Marconi Turay (born 11 August 1949) is a Sierra Leonean athlete. He competed in the men's high jump at the 1968 Summer Olympics.

References

External links
 

1949 births
Living people
Athletes (track and field) at the 1968 Summer Olympics
Sierra Leonean male high jumpers
Olympic athletes of Sierra Leone
People from Waterloo, Sierra Leone